Carla J. Meledandri is a New Zealand chemistry academic, and in 2020 was promoted to Associate Professor at the University of Otago.

Academic career

After a 2009  PhD titled  'NMR studies of membrane-bound nanoparticles and nanoparticle assemblies'  at the Dublin City University, Meledandri moved to the University of Otago, rising to full professor.

The American-born, Irish-educated Meledandri won the 2017 Prime Minister’s MacDiarmid Emerging Scientist Prize, which came with $200,000 in prize money.

Meledandri's work on nanoparticles includes applications in dental health and energy storage.

Selected works 

 Corr, Serena A., Stephen J. Byrne, Renata Tekoriute, Carla J. Meledandri, Dermot F. Brougham, Marina Lynch, Christian Kerskens, Laurence O'Dwyer, and Yurii K. Gun'ko. "Linear assemblies of magnetic nanoparticles as MRI contrast agents." Journal of the American Chemical Society 130, no. 13 (2008): 4214–4215.
 Porter, Gemma C., Donald R. Schwass, Geoffrey R. Tompkins, Sharan KR Bobbala, Natalie J. Medlicott, and Carla J. Meledandri. "AgNP/Alginate Nanocomposite hydrogel for antimicrobial and antibiofilm applications." Carbohydrate Polymers 251 (2021): 117017.
 Meledandri, Carla J., Jacek K. Stolarczyk, Swapankumar Ghosh, and Dermot F. Brougham. "Nonaqueous magnetic nanoparticle suspensions with controlled particle size and nuclear magnetic resonance properties." Langmuir 24, no. 24 (2008): 14159–14165.
 Meledandri, Carla J., Jacek K. Stolarczyk, and Dermot F. Brougham. "Hierarchical gold-decorated magnetic nanoparticle clusters with controlled size." ACS nano 5, no. 3 (2011): 1747–1755.
 Corr, Serena A., Yurii K. Gun’ko, Renata Tekoriute, Carla J. Meledandri, and Dermot F. Brougham. "Poly (sodium-4-styrene) sulfonate− iron oxide nanocomposite dispersions with controlled magnetic resonance properties." The Journal of Physical Chemistry C 112, no. 35 (2008): 13324–13327.

References

External links
 

Living people
New Zealand women academics
Year of birth missing (living people)
New Zealand chemists
Alumni of Dublin City University
Academic staff of the University of Otago
American emigrants to New Zealand